Epitaph was a New Zealand television show that aired on TV1 during evenings in 2001. The show was directed and presented by Paul Gittins. Two books were published based on the programme.

Reception 
The show was successful and well received by critics. A writer for The New Zealand Herald referred to Epitaph as a "genuine original local programme that isn't hung on some thin idea".

References 

2000s New Zealand television series
Television series by Greenstone TV